HMS Benbow was a Victorian era  battleship of the British Royal Navy, named for Admiral John Benbow. Completed in 1888, Benbow spent the majority of her career in reserve with only brief spurts as part of the active fleet. The battleship was scrapped in 1909.

Design

The contract for her construction was awarded to Thames Ironworks, and stipulated delivery within three years. At the time of her construction and indeed for many years afterwards, the limiting factor in battleship construction was the great length of time taken to manufacture heavy artillery, and it was recognised that the gun of 13.5 inch calibre, scheduled to be installed in the other ships of the class, was and would remain in short supply. The shipyard was therefore faced with the choice of either reverting to armament of 12 inches calibre, which was available but which was seen as inferior to guns mounted in contemporary foreign ships, or mounting the new Elswick BL 16.25-inch gun.

Although contemporary guns of 12 inches calibre were perfectly able to destroy any ship afloat, the larger guns were chosen, and mounted singly in barbettes positioned at either end of the superstructure. One of these pieces nevertheless weighed less than a pair of 13.5 inch guns, and the weight saved was used to increase the number of 6 inch guns in the broadside battery. The big guns were not a wholly satisfactory substitute for the armament in their sister-ships. They were slow to load, the rate of fire being only one round every four to five minutes; the chance of hitting the target, being a function of the number of guns in use, was reduced; there was a tendency for the muzzle to droop; and the barrel liner lasted only for some seventy-five rounds, when replacement was a difficult and time-consuming operation.

Construction
Benbow was laid down at Thames Iron Work's Blackwall shipyard on 1 November 1882. She was launched by Catherine Gladstone, wife of former Prime Minister  William Gladstone, on 15 June 1885, and was completed in June 1888.

Service history
She was commissioned on 14 June 1888 for the Mediterranean Fleet, with which she served until October 1891. She was then held in the Reserve until March 1894, with two short commissions to take part in manoevres. From 1894 until April 1904, she served as guardship at Greenock. Captain Richard Penrose Humpage was in command from September 1899, succeeded by Captain Francis Raymond Pelly in June 1901. According to 1901 Census (2 April 1901)( RG13: Piece: 2114 Folio: 163) HMS Benbow was in the Reserve Fleet off Keyham Dockyard Devonport. She took part in the fleet review held at Spithead on 16 August 1902 for the coronation of King Edward VII. She remained in the Reserve until sold to Thos. W. Ward in 1909.

References

Bibliography 
 Oscar Parkes,  'British Battleships'

External links
 

 

Admiral-class battleships
Victorian-era battleships of the United Kingdom
Ships built in Leamouth
1885 ships